Jože Podgoršek (born 17 March 1974) is a Slovenian politician and agrarian economist who has served in the 14th Government of Slovenia as the Minister of Agriculture, Forestry and Food from October 2020 to June 2022.

References 

Slovenian politicians
1974 births
Living people
Place of birth missing (living people)
Agriculture ministers of Slovenia